Kampung Boyan is a place located in Taiping, Larut, Matang and Selama District, Perak, Malaysia. Its name is said to have derived its name from the Baweanese (Boyanese) people who lived there during colonial times, when the race course Lumba Kuda was still in Taiping. When the race course moved to Ipoh, most of the Boyanese moved there too. Unlike other Indonesian ethnic groups, such as those from Acheh, Kampar or Java, the Boyanese are more mobile. Therefore, it is very hard to find a Boyanese local at Kampung Boyan anymore.

The early Mussolla "Surau Kampung Boyan" was located near the railway station. Nevertheless, a bigger mosque is now located at Aulong, which was once part of Kampung Boyan. Though it started out as a tin mine in the 1980s, it drew a lot of attention after the rapid development of the Taman and Kamunting mating of the 1980s and 1990s. This attention has left the Kampung Boyan as a mere lane starting from the railway gate, up to Taman Long Jaafar.

Populated places in Perak
Taiping, Perak